The 2019–20 Hartford Hawks men's basketball team  represented the University of Hartford in the 2019–20 NCAA Division I men's basketball season. They played their home games at the Chase Arena at Reich Family Pavilion in West Hartford, Connecticut and were led by tenth-year head coach John Gallagher. They finished the season 18–15, 9–7 in America East play to finish in third place. They defeated UMass Lowell and Stony Brook to advance to the championship game of the America East tournament vs Vermont. However, the championship game, and all postseason tournaments, were cancelled amid the COVID-19 pandemic.

Previous season
The Hawks finished the 2018–19 season 18–15 overall, 10–6 in conference play to finish in fourth place. As the 4th seed in the 2019 America East men's basketball tournament, they beat 5th-seeded UMass Lowell in the quarterfinals 78–70, then lost to 3rd-seeded UMBC in double overtime in the semifinals 85–90.

Roster

Schedule and results

|-
!colspan=12 style=| Non-conference regular season

|-
!colspan=9 style=| America East Conference regular season

|-
!colspan=12 style=| America East tournament
|-

Source

References

Hartford Hawks men's basketball seasons
Hartford Hawks
Hartford
Hartford